Ernest Clifford Allan (Ernie) Edwards (16 September 1912 – 9 May 1974) was an Australian politician who represented the South Australian House of Assembly seat of Eyre from 1968 to 1970 for the Liberal and Country League.

References

1912 births
1974 deaths
Members of the South Australian House of Assembly
Liberal and Country League politicians
20th-century Australian politicians